This is a list of diplomatic missions in Belize.  The official capital of Belize is Belmopan, however five countries maintain their embassies in the former capital, Belize City, on the Caribbean coast.  There are a total of 12 embassies/high commission in the country, with several other countries accrediting ambassadors from elsewhere.

Embassies/High Commissions
Entries marked with an asterisk (*) are member-states of the Commonwealth of Nations. As such, their embassies are formally termed as "high commissions".

Belmopan

*

Belize City

Consulates
Benque Viejo del Carmen
 (Consulate-General)

Missions

Accredited embassies
Resident in Mexico City unless otherwise noted

 (St. John's)

 (Managua)
 (Port of Spain)
 (Nassau)
  
 (New York City)
 (Bridgetown)

 (New York City)
 (Havana)
 (Guatemala City)

 (San Salvador)
 (San José)
 (Managua)
 (Santo Domingo)
 (Roseau)
 (San Salvador)

 (New York City)
 (New York City)
 (New York City)
 (Managua)
 (San Salvador)
 (Guatemala City)
 (Washington)

 (Georgetown)
 (Panama City)
 (San Salvador)

 (New York City)

 (New York City)
 
 
 

 (Washington, D.C.)
 (Panama City) 
 (Washington, D.C.)
 (Washington, D.C.) 
  
 (Washington, D.C.)
 (Washington, D.C.)
 (Beirut)
 (Havana)

 (New York City)
 (Havana)
 (New York City)

 (Bridgetown)
 (Kingston)
 (Havana)
 (Guatemala City)
 (New York City)
 (New York City)
 (Washington, D.C.)

 (Special Delegation in Mexico City)
 
 (San Salvador)

 (San Jose)

 (Castries)
 (Managua)

 (Kingston)

 (Guatemala City)
 (Paramaribo)
 (Washington D.C.)
 (Havana)
 
 (Castries)
 (Washington D.C.)
 (Washington D.C.)

 (Washington D.C.)

 (Washington D.C.)
 (Washington D.C.)
 (Washington D.C.)
 (Port-of-Spain)
 (Guatemala City)
 (Washington D.C.)
 (Washington D.C.)
 (New York City)

 (New York City)
 (Managua)
  
 (New York City)

 (New York City)
 (Washington D.C.)
 (Washington D.C.)

Former Embassy

See also
 Foreign relations of Belize

References

Overview - Diplomatic Corps. Ministry of Foreign Affairs, Belize
List of diplomatic missions in Belize

Foreign relations of Belize
Belize
Diplomatic missions